Our Lady of Alice Bhatti (2011) is a novel by Pakistani author and journalist, Mohammed Hanif.

Plot
The story revolves around the everyday life of a Christian nurse working in a government hospital in the Pakistani city of Karachi.

The author explained that it was a love story, but some critics suggested that the novel is also a statement on the plight of religious minorities living in Pakistan.

Reception
It was shortlisted for the Wellcome Trust Book Prize (2012), and the DSC Prize for South Asian Literature (2013).

References

External links
"Our Lady of Alice Bhatti by Mohammed Hanif", The Guardian, 23 October 2011

2011 novels
Pakistani novels
Novels by Mohammed Hanif
Jonathan Cape books
Novels set in Karachi